The Conchos chub (Gila pulchra) is a cyprinid fish endemic to  Mexico.

References

Chubs (fish)
Freshwater fish of Mexico
Gila (fish)
Taxa named by Charles Frédéric Girard
Fish described in 1856